Jesús Morales Martínez (born December 18, 1985, in Uruapan) is a Mexican former professional footballer, who last played as a striker for C.F. La Piedad, wearing jersey #25. He made his debut for Chivas de Guadalajara April 9, 2005 against Chiapas, a game which resulted in a 0–2 loss for Guadalajara.  At one point during 2006, he was loaned to Chivas USA of Major League Soccer, and played seven games for the team.

External links
 
 
 
 Jesús Morales at Esmas.com 

1985 births
Living people
Mexican expatriate footballers
Chivas USA players
Atlante F.C. footballers
Club León footballers
People from Uruapan
Footballers from Michoacán
Mexican footballers
Expatriate soccer players in the United States
Major League Soccer players
Association football forwards